Yesterday is a 1985 Polish drama film directed by Radosław Piwowarski. The film was selected as the Polish entry for the Best Foreign Language Film at the 58th Academy Awards, but was not accepted as a nominee.

Cast
 Piotr Siwkiewicz as Pawel Mitura 'Ringo'
 Anna Kaźmierczak as Ania
 Andrzej Zieliński as John
 Krzysztof Majchrzak as Biegacz
 Krystyna Feldman as Ciotka
 Henryk Bista as Dyrector
 Waldemar Ignaczak as George
 Robert Piechota as Paul
 Stanislaw Brudny as Ksiacz

See also
 List of submissions to the 58th Academy Awards for Best Foreign Language Film
 List of Polish submissions for the Academy Award for Best Foreign Language Film

References

External links
 

1985 films
1985 drama films
Polish drama films
1980s Polish-language films